Jakob Sporrenberg (16 September 1902 – 6 December 1952) was an SS-Gruppenführer und Generalleutnant der Polizei in Minsk, Belarus and Lublin, Poland. After the war, Sporrenberg stood trial in Poland and was convicted in 1950 of war crimes and sentenced to death. He was executed in December 1952.

Biography
Jakob Sporrenberg was born on 16 September 1902 in Düsseldorf, Germany. Sporrenberg joined the NSDAP in 1925. In 1929 he was appointed an SA officer and one year later joined the SS, rising to the rank of SS-Brigadeführer by 1933. In January 1940, he was promoted to the rank of SS-Gruppenführer (Generalleutnant). 

From July to August 1941, he was SS and Police Leader (SSPF) in the Generalbezirk Weißruthenien, headquartered in Minsk. He then served on the staff of Reichskommissar Erich Koch in the Reichskommissariat Ukraine. In March 1943 he was assigned to the staff of SS-Obergruppenführer Erich von dem Bach-Zelewski to combat partisans. Sporrenberg subsequently succeeded Odilo Globočnik as SSPF of Lublin, in the Generalgouvernement of occupied Poland from August 1943 to November 1944. In this capacity, Sporrenberg oversaw and implemented the mass shooting of Jews during Operation "Harvest Festival". 

In November 1944 Sporrenberg and several of his staff were redeployed to Norway. There Sporrenberg served as SS and Police Leader of Süd-Norwegen (South Norway). In May 1945, Sporrenberg and his staff were captured by British forces. Their interrogation shed much light on Globočnik's activities in Lublin. One outcome of his interrogation was the transfer of Sporrenberg from the PWIS Detachment (Norway) in Oslo to the MI19 interrogation centre in Kensington Palace Gardens, London, known as the "London Cage"; for further questioning by the War Crimes Interrogation Unit. This established his participation in a number of war crimes committed in Poland and the Soviet Union.

Postwar
Sporrenberg was extradited to Poland in October 1946, and sentenced to death by a Polish court in Warsaw in 1950. He was hanged on 6 December 1952.

Sporrenberg is the supposed source for Prawda o Wunderwaffe (2000), a book about the alleged German occult secret weapon Die Glocke (The Bell) by Polish writer Igor Witkowski, who claimed to have gained access to transcripts of an interrogation by Polish authorities of Sporrenberg through an unnamed contact in the Polish intelligence service. The book is widely considered a hoax.

See also
List SS-Gruppenführer

References

External links
  
 Porträt und Biographie im Handbuch der Reichstagsabgeordneten

1902 births
1952 deaths
Executed people from North Rhine-Westphalia
General Government
Holocaust perpetrators in Belarus
Holocaust perpetrators in Poland
Kapp Putsch participants
Members of the Reichstag of the Weimar Republic
Members of the Reichstag of Nazi Germany
Military personnel from Düsseldorf
German prisoners of war in World War II held by the United Kingdom
Nazis convicted of war crimes
People executed for war crimes
Nazis executed by Poland by hanging
Nazi Party politicians
People extradited from Germany
People extradited to Poland
People from the Rhine Province
Prisoners and detainees of the British military
Recipients of the Iron Cross (1939), 1st class
People of Reichskommissariat Ostland
SS and Police Leaders
SS-Gruppenführer
Sturmabteilung officers
20th-century Freikorps personnel
Executed mass murderers